Schoutenia is a genus of flowering plants. It ranges from Indochina through Malaysia, Indonesia, New Guinea, and Northern Australia.

Traditionally included in the family Tiliaceae, it is included in the expanded Malvaceae in the APG and most subsequent systematics. Pieter Willem Korthals described it in 1847/8 and named it after the explorer Willem Schouten.

Species
There are ten accepted species.
 Schoutenia accrescens (Mast.) Merr. Peninsular Thailand, Malay Peninsula, Borneo
 Schoutenia cornerii Roekm. Malay Peninsula
 Schoutenia curtisii Roekm. Thailand
 Schoutenia furfuracea Kochummen Malay Peninsula
 Schoutenia glomerata King Malay Peninsula
 Schoutenia godefroyana Baill. Thailand, Cambodia
 Schoutenia kostermansii Roekm. Thailand
 Schoutenia kunstleri King Peninsular Thailand, Malay Peninsula, Java
 Schoutenia leprosula Saw Malay Peninsula
 Schoutenia ovata Korth. Vietnam, Laos, Cambodia, Thailand, Java, Lesser Sunda Islands, Maluku, New Guinea, Northern Territory

Footnotes

References
  (2007): Synonymy of Malvaceae. Retrieved 2008-JUN-25.

 
Malvaceae genera
Taxonomy articles created by Polbot